Phukhao Thong may refer to:

 Wat Phukhao Thong and Chedi Phukhao Thong, a historic temple and its main stupa, in Phra Nakhon Si Ayutthaya Province
 Phukhao Thong, Phra Nakhon Si Ayutthaya, the subdistrict that covers the historic area
 Phukhao Thong or Phra Borommabanphot, a stupa atop an artificial hill in Wat Saket in Bangkok